Heads of Ayr may refer to:

 Heads of Ayr (headland), South Ayrshire, Scotland, UK; a headland, see List of United Kingdom locations: He-Hem
 Heads of Ayr, South Ayrshire, Ayrshire, Scotland, UK; a locality, see List of places in South Ayrshire
 Heads of Ayr (W174), a conservancy site, see List of Nature Conservation Review sites
 Heads of Ayr (holiday camp), Ayrshire, Scotland, UK; a holiday resort
 Heads of Ayr Holiday Camp railway station, Ayrshire, Scotland, UK; a defunct rail station
 Heads of Ayr railway station, Ayrshire, Scotland, UK; a defunct rail station

See also

 
 
 Ayr (disambiguation)